Gunderdehi is one of the 90 Legislative Assembly constituencies of Chhattisgarh state in India. It is in Balod district and is a part of Kanker Lok Sabha constituency.

Members of Legislative Assembly

Madhya Pradesh Legislative Assembly 

 1972: Ghana Ram Sahu, Independent
 1977: Ghana Ram Sahu, Indian National Congress
 1980: Harihar Prasad Sharma, Indian National Congress (I)
 1985: Harihar Prasad Sharma, Indian National Congress
 1990: Tarachand Sahu, Bharatiya Janata Party
 1995: Tarachand Sahu, Bharatiya Janata Party
 1998: Ghana Ram Sahu, Indian National Congress

Chhattisgarh Legislative Assembly 

 2003: Ramshila Sahu, Bharatiya Janata Party
 2008: Virendra Kumar Sahu, Bharatiya Janata Party
 2013: Rajendra Kumar Rai, Indian National Congress

Election results

2018

See also
List of constituencies of the Chhattisgarh Legislative Assembly
 Gunderdehi
 Balod district
 Kanker (Lok Sabha constituency)

References

Balod district
Assembly constituencies of Chhattisgarh